Prise 2 (French: "Take 2") is a  Canadian French language specialty channel owned by Groupe TVA, a division of Quebecor Media.

Prise 2 broadcasts television series and films, primarily from Quebec and the United States, from the 1970s, 1980s, and 1990s.

History

In October 2005, TVA Group was granted approval by the Canadian Radio-television and Telecommunications Commission (CRTC) to launch a television channel called Nostalgie, described as "a national, French-language Category 2 specialty programming undertaking devoted to television and movie classics."

The channel was launched on February 9, 2006 as Prise 2.

On August 27, 2012, Groupe TVA launched Prise 2 HD, a HD feed simulcasting the standard definition feed. It is currently available on Vidéotron, Bell Satellite TV and Bell Fibe TV.

Programming

References

External links
 

Digital cable television networks in Canada
French-language television networks in Canada
Television channels and stations established in 2006
2006 establishments in Quebec